The Waldo Hills are a range of hills in the Willamette Valley of Oregon, United States. The hills are named after pioneer Daniel Waldo.

Geology
The hills stretch out from Mill Creek in a northeasterly direction. These hills were formed by a cuesta of Columbia River Basalt Group. Rocks of the hills include Tertiary volcanic bedrock, sedimentary bedrock, and Plio-Pleistocene sedimentary basin fill shaped by elongate domical folds. The Waldo Hills form part of the divider between the upper and lower Willamette Valley. Additionally, the Waldo Hills as part of a larger fault system of low-lying hills in the mid-valley, are the largest geological structure in the mid-Willamette Valley. Along with the Silverton Hills, these hills form the foothills to the Cascade Mountains to the east.

Settlement
Euro-American settlement of the Waldo Hills began in 1843 when Daniel Waldo settled a land claim there and began farming. Later settlers included Homer Davenport and Samuel L. Simpson, along with Waldo's sons John and William.
In 1846, the hills were the site of the formation and drilling of the Oregon Rangers, a militia formed by the Provisional Government of Oregon.

See also
Eola Hills
Howell Prairie
Salem Hills
Theodore Thurston Geer

References

External links
Winter scene in the Waldo Hills from Salem Public Library Historic Photographs Collection
Geologic map of the area
The Battle of the Abiqua

Hills of Oregon
Landforms of Marion County, Oregon